Jeffrey Wincott (born 8 May 1956) is a Canadian actor and martial artist best known for his lead role in the television series Night Heat.

Wincott was also the star of several martial arts films in the 1990s. In 1996 he was named one of the "Martial Arts Movie Stars of the Next Century" by Black Belt magazine.

Early life and education
Wincott was born and raised in Toronto. His mother was from Piacenza, Italy. His English father was an amateur boxer. Actor Michael Wincott is his younger brother.

Wincott began studying taekwondo at 15 and also swam competitively. Wincott became interested in acting while in high school and wound up turning down a swimming scholarship to study acting at Ryerson Polytechnical Institute, where he studied for 2 years.

Career
One of Wincott's first acting jobs was in 1979 when he appeared on two episodes of the Canadian sitcom King of Kensington. He also appeared in an episode of the Canadian series The Littlest Hobo. that same year.

In 1980 he toured with the Toronto-based Actors Touring Company in their production of Romeo and Juliet, followed by the Runnymede Theatre production Play it Again, Sam in which Wincott played the role of Humphrey Bogart. That same year he also had a small role in the horror movie Prom Night, and the following year he had a small role in the film Quest for Fire.

Wincott appeared in an episode of the Canadian drama series The Great Detective in 1982. In 1981 and 1983 he appeared again in episodes of The Littlest Hobo. He also appeared in episodes of the Canadian TV series Hangin' In in 1983 and 1984.

From 1981 to 1983 Wincott lived in New York City, where he studied privately with Juilliard teacher Michael Kahn, before moving on to Los Angeles to film a beer commercial for Molson. While in L.A. he taught breakdancing and would also perform mime on Venice Beach for money.

In 1984 Wincott returned to Toronto and began working on the Canadian police drama series Night Heat. The series starred Scott Hylands as Detective Kevin O'Brien and Wincott as his partner, the brash and impulsive Detective Frank Giambone. The series ran for four seasons from 1985 to 1989 and also aired on CBS, making it the first Canadian-produced drama series to air on an American network.  In 1986 he also appeared in the Canadian drama film The Boy in Blue starring Nicolas Cage.

In the 1990s Wincott was the star of several action films, often making use of his martial arts skills.  Some of these films include Martial Law 2: Undercover (1991), "Mission of Justice" opposite Brigitte Nielsen (1992), Deadly Bet (1992), Martial Outlaw (1993), The Killing Machine (1994), Street Law (1995), Last Man Standing (1995), The Donor (1995), No Exit (1995), When the Bullet Hits the Bone (1996), and Future Fear (1997).

In 2003 Wincott appeared in two episodes of the second season of TV series 24. He played the recurring role of James 'Jimmy' Cacuzza on the crime drama series Sons of Anarchy, appearing in episodes that aired in 2008, 2012 and 2013. In 2012 Wincott played Captain Mancuso in an episode in the third season of the TV series Blue Bloods, and reprised the role in the series fifth season. He also played recurring character Marshal Hilliard in the miniseries The Lizzie Borden Chronicles (2015) and Detective Lucas in the miniseries The Night Of (2016).

He was featured in the action films The Invasion (2007) and Unstoppable (2010) and played a supporting role in the independent film Kringle Time.

In 2019, Jeff and his wife Charlotte founded Hollow Metropolis Films in order to create and produce their own work. In 2020, the Wincotts co-produced their first feature film, The Issue with Elvis. Directed by Charlotte, the film stars Jeff, as well as their son Wolfgang. Wincott won the Best Actor award for his role in the film at the Toronto Beaches Film Festival, and the Montgomery International Film Festival. The Wincotts also co-produced Fall Fight Shine, a documentary about addiction and recovery featuring Jeff's own recovery story. The film premiered in 2021.

Film

Short film

Television

Awards and nominations

Theatre work

See also
 List of University of Waterloo people

References

External links
Official site

1956 births
Living people
Canadian male film actors
Canadian male television actors
Canadian people of English descent
Canadian people of Italian descent
People from Scarborough, Toronto
Male actors from Toronto
Canadian male taekwondo practitioners